Indrek is an Estonian masculine given name. It is the Estonian form of Henry and may refer to:
Indrek Allmann (born 1972), architect
Indrek Hargla (born 1970), novelist and screenwriter 
Indrek Hirv (born 1956),  Estonian poet, translator and artist
Indrek Kajupank (born 1988), basketball player
Indrek Kannik (born 1965), journalist, civil servant and politician
Indrek Kaseorg (born 1967), decathlete
Indrek Meelak (born 1960), prosecutor and politician
Indrek Otsus (born 1955), bodybuilder and cyclist
Indrek Pertelson (born 1971), judoka
Indrek Raadik (born 1975), musician
Indrek Raudne (born 1975), entrepreneur and politician
Indrek Rumma (born 1969), basketball player
Indrek Saar (born 1973), politician and actor
Indrek Sammul (born 1972), actor
Indrek Sei (born 1972), swimmer
Indrek Sirel (born 1970), military commander
Indrek Siska (born 1984), beach soccer player
Indrek Taalmaa (born 1967), actor
Indrek Tarand (born 1964), politician
Indrek Tart (born 1946), sociologist, literary scientist and poet
Indrek Teder (born 1957), lawyer, jurist and politician
Indrek Toome (born 1943), politician and businessman
Indrek Tobreluts (born 1976), biathlete
Indrek Turi (born 1981), decathlete
Indrek Tustit (born 1978), track and field athlete, coach and physiotherapist
Indrek Varblane (born 1968), basketball player
Indrek Visnapuu (born 1976), basketball player and coach
Indrek Zelinski (born 1974), football player

References

See also
Truth and Justice (Estonian: Tõde ja õigus), a 1926–1933 pentalogy by Estonian author Anton Hansen Tammsaare which features a character named Indrek.

Estonian masculine given names